"A Little Bit of Heaven", is a 1965 hit song recorded by Ronnie Dove.

Background
The single was released by Diamond Records.  The song peaked at #16 on the Hot 100 and #4 on the Easy Listening Chart. 
It was also included in his album One Kiss for Old Times' Sake.

Chart performance

Cover Versions 
Singer Wayne Newton covered the song for his "Summer Wind" album.

References

1965 singles
Ronnie Dove songs
Songs written by Kenny Young
1965 songs
Songs written by Artie Resnick